A bronze sculpture depicting Robert McAlpin Williamson by Lucas Adams is installed outside the Williamson Museum in Georgetown, Texas, United States. The statue was erected in December 2013, and cost $40,000. The museum raised approximately half the funds.

See also
 2013 in art

References

External links
 
 

2013 establishments in Texas
2013 sculptures
Bronze sculptures in Texas
Buildings and structures in Georgetown, Texas
Monuments and memorials in Texas
Outdoor sculptures in Texas
Sculptures of men in Texas
Statues in Texas